The Yamaha XT350 is a dual-sport motorcycle produced between 1985 and 2000 by Yamaha Motor Corp.

Features and capabilities
This is a 350cc four stroke enduro (motorcycle) with long travel suspension. It is street legal because it has mirrors, indicators, a horn, a headlight, a tail light and a licence plate holder.

External links
Motorcycle.com review
Total Motorcycle Website review including lifecycle details

XT 350
Dual-sport motorcycles
Motorcycles introduced in 1985